A number of steamships have carried the name Paris, after the French capital city.

, Built for the London, Brighton and South Coast Railway, wrecked in 1863
, built by Barclay, Curle & Co
, Built for the London, Brighton and South Coast Railway. Sold in 1888.
, built for the London, Chatham and Dover Railway, lost in 1913.
, Built for the London, Brighton and South Coast Railway.
, built for the American Line.
, a Belgian ship renamed Charles Jose in 1933 and lost in 1934.
, a Norwegian cargo ship sunk in 1917.
, a passenger ship built for the London, Brighton and South Coast Railway, bombed and sunk in 1940
, a Compagnie Générale Transatlantique liner lost by fire in 1939, capsized in Le Havre harbour and remained there for the duration of World War II.
, a Norwegian passenger ship seized by the Kriegsmarine in 1940 and torpedoed and sunk in 1945.
, a British collier that collided with another ship and sank in 1941.

Ship names

fr:Paris (paquebot)
nl:Paris (schip)